The Ægir-class offshore patrol vessel is a class of two offshore patrol vessels serving in the Icelandic Coast Guard (ICG). They participated in the two latter Cod Wars. The vessels conduct patrols, search and rescue, fishery inspections, general law enforcement and counter-terrorism operations in the Icelandic exclusive economic zone and the waters of the surrounding territories, such as Greenland and Jan Mayen.

Design and description
Rear Admiral Pétur Sigurðsson, commander of the ICG, set forth a requirement for a ship larger than both Þór and Óðinn and more seaworthy. The vessels were also armoured for icebreaking.

The vessels have a 20-ton bollard-pulling winch and passive rolling tanks.

The Ægir class was initially armed with a  Hotchkiss cannon. However, these weapons were replaced in 1990 with the Bofors /L60 autocannon, which in turn was replaced with the 40 mm Bofors L70 in the late 2000s. Other weapons include net cutters, which the Icelandic Coast Guard used during the Cod Wars. A large crane is situated forward of the helicopter deck. The ships of the class are equipped with Sperry surface search and navigational radar. Týr is equipped with hull-mounted sonar. The ships sport a helicopter deck aft and a hangar located between the funnels. In 1997, the helicopter deck was extended. The ships have a complement of 19.

Vessels

Construction and career
Ægir was the first to be constructed, by Aalborg Shipyard in Denmark and was launched in 1967. Týr was constructed by Dannebrog Værft in Denmark and was launched on 10 October 1974. Ægir entered service with the ICG in 1968 and Týr on 15 March 1975. The ICG uses the vessels to conduct patrols search and rescue, fishery inspections, general law enforcement and counter-terrorism operations in the Icelandic exclusive economic zone. In 1994, a crane was fitted in both ships forward of the helicopter deck on the starboard side. In 1997, the ships underwent a refit that extended their helicopter decks and installed a radome atop the ship. In 2005, Ægir underwent a refit in Poland that improved the bridge and accommodations along with the installation of in-flight refuelling equipment for the helicopters. Týr received the same modifications in Poland in 2006.

Citations

References

External links
 Icelandic Coast Guard website

Patrol ship classes